is a Japanese actress, voice actress, singer, and pianist. She is best known for her work in the anime Tsubasa: Reservoir Chronicle where she voices Sakura and some of the theme songs for the Aria anime series. She is associated with Amuse, Inc. One of her earliest voice acting performances was the character "Sister" in a short-anime movie Bavel no Hon when she was 10.  She married singer Yutaro Miura in 2020.

Musical history
Makino took up piano at the age of four. The film director Shunji Iwai discovered her talent for playing the piano when she was seven years old and from the age of 8 to 17. She played piano solos for three of his films: Love Letter, All About Lily Chou-Chou and Hana and Alice. She graduated from Tokyo College of Music as a piano major with the top score in her senior year.

She made her debut as a singer in 2005 with "Omna Magni," produced by Yoko Kanno. It was used as the ending theme song for the anime Sousei no Aquarion. In the April of the same year, she also debuted as a voice actress, starring as heroine Sakura in Tsubasa Chronicle and recording several songs for its soundtrack.

She released "Amrita", the ending song for the Tsubasa Chronicle film, as well as "Undine", the opening theme for the TV Tokyo anime Aria the Animation, coupled with its inserted song "Symphony". It achieved No. 25 on the Oricon chart.

In 2006, Makino released two songs from another TV Tokyo anime, Aria the Natural, the theme song "Euphoria" and an insert song, "Amefuribana." They were released on one product and achieved No. 18 on the Oricon chart. In addition, she released her debut album, Tenkyū no Ongaku on 6 December 2006.

In 2007, she was invited to represent Japan at the Japan-China cultural exchange event. She also released two singles for the programmes Sketchbook ~full color's~ and Tsubasa: Reservoir Chronicle.

On 23 January 2008, Makino released her seventh single, "Spirale," as the opening theme of Aria the Origination. Coupled with the anime's insert song, "Yokogao," the single reached No. 20 on the Oricon chart. She also performed her first solo concert at the Fuchuno Mori Geijutsu Gekijo Wien Hall in Tokyo, where she sang and played the piano accompaniment for each song. She released her eponymous second album, Makino Yui in March 2008. It reached No. 22 on the Oricon chart. She graduated from Tokyo College of Music as a piano major in the same month.

She held her Holography concert at SHIBUYA-AX in 2011.

In March 2013, Makino was hired to sing and be the "Hungry Zombie Francesca" voice in a national campaign to promote the Hokkaido region throughout Japan.

Overseas guest appearances
 2007: Japan Ambassador, Beijing (Japan-China Cultural Exchange)
 July 2009: Performance at Japan Expo, France
 September 2009: Guest of Honor, New York Anime Festival, USA
 26 December 2009: Guest Artiste, Musical Concert in EOY at Drama Centre @ National Library, Singapore
 16 January 2010: Guest Artiste, at Korea
 19 June 2010: Concert, in Rome, Italy
 21 June 2010: Ongaku no Hi in France, as guest
 September 2011: Concert in Hong Kong
 October 2011: Concert in Guangzhou
 November 2011: Anime Festival at Shanghai
 December 2012: Performance at J-FEST 2012, Russia
 December 2013: ACT Expo in Macau
 March 2015: TOUCH Spring Festival in Vietnam
 May 2015: Otafest in Canada
 July 2016: CharaExpo in Singapore
 August 2016: Otakon 2016, in USA

Filmography

Anime television series

 Tsubasa Chronicle (2005) as Sakura
 Aria The Natural (2006) as Akane in episode 26
 Welcome to the NHK! (2006) as Misaki Nakahara
 Spider Riders: Oracle of Heroes (2006) as Girl in episode 7
 Coron-chan (2006) as Byobā
 Demashita! Powerpuff Girls Z (2006) as Miko Shirogane
 Zegapain (2006) as Jen May-Yu
 Tsubasa Chronicle (2006) (second season) as Sakura
 Kaze no Stigma (2007) as Lapis Suirei/Cui Ling
 Bokurano (2007) as Aiko Tokosumi
 Sketchbook (2007) as Hazuki Torikai
 Asu no Yoichi! (2009) as Tsubasa Tsubame
 Sora Kake Girl (2009) as Honoka Kawai
 Taishō Yakyū Musume (2009) as Kyouko Sakurami
 Needless (2009) as Mio
 Nodame Cantabile: Finale (2010) as Namuri Rima (Episode 4)
 Angel Beats! (2010) as Yusa
 C (2011) as Hanabi Ikuta
 Ano Hi Mita Hana no Namae o Boku-tachi wa Mada Shiranai. (2011) as Aki
 Un-Go (2011) as Umezawa Yumeno
 Tokurei Sochi Dantai Stella Jo-Gakuin Kōtō-ka C3-Bu (2013) as Yura Yamato
 Chaika - The Coffin Princess (2014) as Layla
 Francesca: Girls Be Ambitious (2014) as Francesca
 Space Dandy (2014) as Freckles (ep.17) 
 Gundam Build Fighters Try (2014) as Fumina Hoshino
 The Idolmaster Cinderella Girls (2015) as Mayu Sakuma
 Yamada-kun and the Seven Witches (2015) as Meiko Ōtsuka
 Wish Upon the Pleiades (2015) as Hikaru 
 Ushio and Tora (2015) as Reiko Hanyuu
 The Idolmaster Cinderella Girls 2nd Season (2015) as Mayu Sakuma
 PriPara (2015) as Aroma Kurosu (eps.39–140)
 Hundred (2016) as Erica Candle
 Sekkō Boys (2016) as Mira Hanayashiki
 Shōnen Maid (2016) as Miyako Ōtori
 Sagrada Reset (2017) as Yōka Murase
 Love & Lies (2017) as Ririna Sanada
 King's Game The Animation (2017) as Kana Ueda
 Aikatsu on Parade! (2019) as Saya Kiseki
 Farewell, My Dear Cramer (2021) as Chika Kirishima
 Tokyo 24th Ward (2022) as Mari Sakuragi
 Life with an Ordinary Guy Who Reincarnated into a Total Fantasy Knockout (2022) as Ugraine

OVA and ONA

 Tsubasa Tokyo Revelations as Sakura
 Hōkago no Pleiades as Hikaru
 Hoshi no Umi no Amuri as Amuri
 Tsubasa Shunraiki as Sakura
 xxxHOLiC Shunmuki as Sakura
 Yamada-kun and the Seven Witches OVA as Meiko Ōtsuka

Anime films
 The Princess in the Birdcage Kingdom as Sakura
 Top wo Nerae 2! & Top wo Nerae! Gattai Gekijō-ban!! as Akaitakami
 PriPara Mi~nna no Akogare Let's Go PriPari (2016) as Aroma Kurosu

Video games
 Arc Rise Fantasia as Ryfia
 Which Witch? as Yuugi Saki
 Tsubasa Chronicle as Sakura
 Pachinko Sora wo Kakeru Shōjo!! as Honoka Kawai
 The Idolmaster Cinderella Girls as Mayu Sakuma
 Azur Lane as MNF La Galissonnière
 Alchemy Stars as Siobhan

Drama CDs
 Welcome to the NHK! as Misaki Nakahara
 Wagamama Sentai Bloom Heart as Tougaiji Yuri a.k.a. White Lily
 Zegapain as Jen May-Yu
 Tsubasa Chronicle as Sakura

Live stage
 High Color (2009) as Seiki Tomoyo

Radio
 Yui to Mika no Puri Suite!-Tsubasa Chronicle radio, hosted by Yui Makino and Mika Kikuchi as host
 Sketchbook Radio-Sketchbook radio, hosted by Kana Hanazawa, Asuka Nakase and Yui Makino as host
 Puri Suite RETURNS!-Tsubasa Chronicle (second season) radio, hosted by Miyu Irino, Yui Makino, Mika Kikuchi, Tetsu Inada and Daisuke Namikawa as host
 Sore Kake Radio & TV-Sora Kake Girl radio, hosted by MAKO as a guest in several episodes
 ArcRise LADY RADIO HOUR-Arc Rise Fantasia radio, hosted by Yui Makino and Emiri Katō as host.
 Which Witch? Sora no Gakko Host Club?-Which Witch? radio, hosted by Asumi Kana and Aki Toyosaki as guest and host, replacing Aki in two episodes.
 Makino Yui no Daimondorobicchi-Makino's own radio.
 Makino Yui no Fuwa Fuwa Radio-Makino's own radio, for Fuwa Fuwa single promo.

Discography

Singles

Albums

Awards
She was nominated for "best young voice actress" for her outstanding portrayal of Misaki Nakahara from Welcome to the N.H.K.

Other
Anime soundtracks
 Omna Magni
Notes: This song was used as an ending theme song in Genesis of Aquarion.
 Sousei no Aquarion
Notes: This song was used as the intro theme song in Genesis of Aquarion.
 
Notes: She sang this song with a fellow voice actor, Miyu Irino, who voices Syaoran. The song was used as an ending theme song in the 3rd Drama CD of Tsubasa Chronicle.
 
Notes: This song was used as an insert song in episode 50 in Tsubasa Chronicle.
 Dark Side ni Tsuitekite
Notes: This song was used as an insert song in Welcome to the N.H.K.
 Synchronicity
Notes: This song is the opening theme song for Tsubasa Tokyo Revelations
 Tenshi no Hashigo ~crepuscular rays~
Notes: This song is the ending theme for Arc Rise Fantasia
 Imaginal Song
Notes: This song is one of Ryphia's songs with her vocalizing in Arc Rise Fantasia.
 Jouka no Hikari (Light of Purification)
Notes: This song is one of Ryphia's songs with her vocalizing in Arc Rise Fantasia
 Ryfia no Negai (Ryfia's Wish)
Notes: This song is one of Ryphia's songs with her vocalizing in Arc Rise Fantasia
 Ten no Namida (Heaven's Tears)
Notes: This song is one of Ryphia's songs with her vocalizing in Arc Rise Fantasia

Anime character songs
 Towa no Omoi
Notes: Found on the first Tsubasa Chronicle Drama & Character Album.
 Yacchaouyo!
Notes: This song was released on the first character song album for the OVA Amuri in Star Ocean.
 Umidorika -Amuri Ver.-
Notes: This song was released on the first character song album for the OVA Amuri in Star Ocean.
 Moroi Mirai Kirai (I Hate Fragile Future)
Notes: This song was released on the third character song album of Sora wo Kakeru Shōjo.
 Wakakusa iro no Kleiner Vogel (Light Green-colored Little Bird)
Notes: This song was released on the second character song album of Which Witch?

References

External links

  
 Yui Makino at GamePlaza Haruka Voice Acting Database 
 Yui Makino at Oricon 
 
 

1986 births
Living people
Amuse Inc. talents
Anime singers
Japanese child actresses
Japanese video game actresses
Japanese voice actresses
Voice actresses from Mie Prefecture
21st-century Japanese actresses
21st-century Japanese women singers
21st-century Japanese singers